The 2020 ATP Cup was the first edition of the ATP Cup, an international outdoor hard court men's team tennis tournament held by the Association of Tennis Professionals (ATP). Serving as the opener for the 2020 ATP Tour, it was the first ATP team tournament since the last edition of the World Team Cup in 2012. It was held on 3–12 January 2020 at three venues in the Australian cities of Brisbane, Perth, and Sydney.

Serbia won the tournament, defeating Spain 2–1 in the final.

Background
On 1 July 2018, ATP director, Chris Kermode announced that he had plans to organize a men's team tennis tournament which came after the Davis Cup changed their format six months earlier. The tournament which at the time of the announcement had the name World Team Cup which was identical to the previous World Team Cup that took place in Düsseldorf from 1978 to 2012. 

Four months later, on 15 November, the ATP with Tennis Australia announced that the tournament was renamed to the ATP Cup with twenty four teams playing at three cities in preparation for the Australian Open. Those cities would later be revealed to be Sydney, Brisbane and Perth.

The Hopman Cup was axed to make way for the new tournament.

ATP ranking points

 Maximum 750 points for undefeated singles player, 250 points for doubles.

Entries
In September 2019, the first 18 countries in the ATP Cup Standings qualified for the ATP Cup, based on the ATP ranking of its No. 1 singles player on 9 September and their commitment to play the event. Host country Australia received a wild card. Switzerland withdrew after world number 3 rated Roger Federer withdrew from the event for personal reasons. The final six teams qualified in November, based on ATP rankings at 11 November.

 Qualified in September 2019 
 Qualified in November 2019

Replacement players

Venues

Format
The 24 teams were divided into six groups of four teams each in a round-robin format. The six winners of each group and the two best runners-up would qualify for the quarter-finals. A country's position within its group was determined by ties won, then matches won, and then sets and games won percentages unless two or more teams were tied, in which case a head-to-head win took precedence over matches won.

Group stage
The draw for the ATP Cup was revealed on 16 September 2019 with Brisbane getting Groups A and F, Perth getting Groups B and D, and Sydney getting Groups C and E.
On 14 November, the final five qualifiers were placed in the draw, along with Bulgaria, who were entered the competition after Switzerland withdrew after Roger Federer declined to participate due to logisitical and travel issues.

Overview
G = Group, T = Ties, M = Matches, S = Sets

Group A

France vs. Chile

Serbia vs. South Africa

South Africa vs. Chile

Serbia vs. France

Serbia vs. Chile

France vs. South Africa

Group B

Japan vs. Uruguay

Spain vs. Georgia

Japan vs. Georgia

Spain vs. Uruguay

Spain vs. Japan

Georgia vs. Uruguay

Group C

Belgium vs. Moldova

Great Britain vs. Bulgaria

Bulgaria vs. Moldova

Belgium vs. Great Britain

Great Britain vs. Moldova

Belgium vs. Bulgaria

Group D

United States vs. Norway

Russia vs. Italy

Italy vs. Norway

Russia vs. United States

Russia vs. Norway

Italy vs. United States

Group E

Argentina vs. Poland

Austria vs. Croatia

Croatia vs. Poland

Austria vs. Argentina

Austria vs. Poland

Croatia vs. Argentina

Group F

Greece vs. Canada

Germany vs. Australia

Canada vs. Australia

Germany vs. Greece

Germany vs. Canada

Greece vs. Australia

Ranking of runner-up teams

Knockout stage
The knockout stage took place at the Ken Rosewall Arena in Sydney.

Bracket

Quarter-finals

Great Britain vs. Australia

Argentina vs. Russia

Serbia vs. Canada

Belgium vs. Spain

Semi-finals

Serbia vs. Russia

Australia vs. Spain

Final

Serbia vs. Spain

References

External links
Official website
Draw

2020
2020 ATP Tour
2020 in Australian tennis
January 2020 sports events in Australia